Oles Honchar Dnipro National University (DNU) is an establishment of higher education in Dnipro, Ukraine. It was founded in 1918. The first four faculties were history and linguistics, law, medicine and physics and mathematics.

Nowadays the university has level IV accreditation, with 20 faculty and 1,300 professors, 850 of them PhDs. The university has about 22,000 Ukrainian students and offers 87 majors. It has about 3,000 international students from 20 countries.

It has strong ties with one of the world's largest rocket space centres, Yuzhnoye Design Bureau, and other industrial and scientific organizations in the Donetsk-Pridneprovsk area with population of more than 15 million people.

Being a big education and research center, DNU provides training at all qualifications levels: Master's degree, Specialist's degree, Bachelor's degree. It prepares researchers and university teachers at the post-graduate and doctor of science courses. Second higher education can also be obtained.

According to a decision of the Intersectorial Accreditation Collegiums and to the order of the Ministry of Sciences and Education of Ukraine Dnipropetrovsk National University has been accredited as a higher institution of the 4-th level accreditation. According to the UNESCO poll DNU takes the 6th place of all Ukrainian higher education institutes due to its academic and research indexes.

DNU has 63 agreements with higher education institutes and research centers from many countries of Europe, Asia, the US, Canada. DNU has joined the work of the TEMPUS Program in Ukraine. The first project on reforming the economy was won in 1993. Since then DNU has won 14 projects (including three more Tempus projects in 2009) for terms of 1 to 3 years in sectors of science and education such as economics, management, university managements, social informatics and international economics.

The library has 2,600,000 volumes and computer library rooms.

Since 2007, DNU has been taking part in the Erasmus Mundus Project “External Cooperation Window”. In the plan there is a paragraph about development of close relations with EU universities, and strengthening of exchange programmes. Participation should raising the skills of DNU teachers and improving the style of teaching. The project can give the possibility of progress in implementation of Bologna standards, including ECTS and quality assurance.

History
Ekaterynoslavsky University (now Oles Honchar Dnipro National University) was founded during the Ukrainian state of Pavlo Skoropadsky in 1918. In 1920 Ekaterynoslavsky University was transformed into Ekaterynoslavsky (later in Dnipropetrovsk) Institute of Education, which operated until 1933.

In 1933, Dnipropetrovsk State University was restored, however the revival of the university coincided with the intensification of Stalin's totalitarian regime, which led to mass arrests in a university setting, and irreparable losses of personnel. During World War II some faculty and students went to defend their homeland from the Nazi invaders; others approached Victory Day, working in the evacuation.

In September 2000, Dnipropetrovsk State University acquired the status of a national institution.

(The city of Dnipropetrovsk was renamed Dnipro in May 2016 as part of the decommunization laws enacted a year earlier.)

Faculty and staff
DNU rector Polyakov Mykola Viktorovych, doctor of physical-mathematical sciences, professor, member of the Academy of Sciences of the Ukrainian higher institute of learning, born in 1946, graduated from the mechanical-mathematical faculty of Dnipropetrovsk State University in 1971. He worked as dean of mechanical-mathematical faculty from 1989, and as pro-rector of educational work from 1996. He is rector from November 1998. He is rewarded with orders “For merit” of all three degrees.

DNU has scientific schools in mathematics, mechanics, radiophysics and electronics, rocketry, neurocybernetic, biotechnology, organic chemistry, history of Ukraine, historiography and history of Ukraine, archeology, German, literature and linguistics.

Campuses
The university has 17 teaching and laboratory buildings ("Main Building» No. 1, which is located at Dnipro, Gagarin, 72), seven dormitories for students at 3,500 seats, sports facilities and recreation (Sports Palace with a swimming pool, water station, shooting, hockey playground, outdoor stadium, dispensary, sports camp), the Palace of students (with an assembly hall with 500 seats and a small hall for 120 seats), library with about 2,000,000 copies.

Structure
The university comprises four higher education institutions of the first and second level of accreditation, 16 faculties, 46 research laboratories, three research institutes (Biology, Geography, Power Engineering) the Faculty of Distance and Part-time Education, the Faculty of Continuous Education, the Faculty of Postgraduate Education, the Faculty of Pre-university Preparation, Regional Center of Continuous Education “Prydniprovye” including eight schools, one lyceum and the one gymnasium.

Faculties of the university

 Linguistics
 Social Sciences and International Relations
 Journalism
 International Business
 Business
 History
 Psychology
 Law
 Physics, Electronics and Computer Sciences
 Chemistry
 Biology, ecology and medicine
 Geology and Geography
 Applied Mathematics
 Mechanics and Mathematics
 Physics and Technology

List of specialties
Jurisprudence
Accounting and Auditing
International Economic Relations
Management of Foreign-economic Activity
International Relations
Finances
Banking
Enterprise Economy
Personnel management and labor economics
International economics
Marketing
Russian Language and Literature
Translation (English Language and Literature)
Laboratory Diagnostics
Language and Literature (English)
Language and Literature (German)
Language and Literature (French)
Language and Literature (Chinese)
Language and Literature (Japanese)
Translation (German Language and Literature)
Translation (French Language and Literature)
Journalism
Psychology
Ukrainian Language and Literature
Economic Cybernetics
Social Work
Sociology
Computing
Biology
Biochemistry
Zoology
Botany
Microbiology and virology
Ecology and environmental protection
Archaeology
Physiology
Design
Political Science
Publishing and Editing
Economic Statistics
Automated System Programming
Intellectual Systems for Making Decisions
Computer Systems and Networks
Information Control Systems and Technologies
Food Technologies
Geography
Fine and Crafts Arts
Philosophy
Radioelectronic Devices, Systems and Technologies
History
Defectology
Automatics and Management in Technical Systems
Apparatus of Radio Connection, Radio Broadcasting and Television
Archives Studies
Applied Physics
Microelectronics and Semi-conductive Devices
Biotechnical and Medical Apparatus and Systems
Physics of Solids
Radiophysics and Electronics
Technologies and Means of Telecommunications
Chemistry
Chemical Technology of High Molecular Compounds
Applied Mathematics
Mathematics

Student life
The task of the Council of the faculty students is to protect the rights and responsibilities of students, and to improve student life.

The teachers and scientists of the faculty created a Regional center of the Ukrainian language history and development, where students’ scientific association “Philologist” functions. An annual collection of students’ scientific publications “The young people are eager to comprehend the word” was founded.

A French speaking students’ theatre and speaking club was founded at the Roman philology chair in 1995.

The Ukrainian and foreign philology and art-criticism faculty run first-year student, author's song contests, New Year carnivals “Masks disappear in midnight”, CFI – the contests among faculties, “Miss faculty” contests and others. The Council of the students organizes visits to children's homes with festival concerts and gifts during some years.

The meeting with creators became traditional at the faculty: Irena Rozdobud’ko, Larisa Denysenko, Lesia Stepovychka, brothers Kapranov, Liubko Deresh, Yurii Andrushevych, Serhii Zhadan and others.

The students of the faculty conducted an action “Do not be indifferent, find out more about AIDS”.

Students take a part in the cultural life of the university: national circus studio “Raiduha”, national dance ensembles “Veselka”, theater studio “Hravtsi”. An ensemble of guitar players is organized at the faculty. The theatre group is  “Vidlunnia”, who have put on plays “Roksolana”, “Marusia Churai”, “Evening at the farmstead FUPandAC” and other. The young people's chamber choir is “Yunist”. Second-year students of the English philology chair organized a studio of a modern dance “Sweets”, and first-year students organized a show-ballet “Dance sensation”.

A club of talented young people “Crocus” functions at the faculty. Any person can become its member if they write poetry or prose.

Students take an active part in sport life of the university. A student became a prize-winner of Dnipropetrovs’k region in track and field athletics, and another became a champion of Ukraine in water polo. Students of the faculty became the members of the combined team in badminton, swimming, track and field athletics, and weight-lifting sport.

Notable alumni

Economist and scientist Natalia Boytsun
Oles Honchar, a prominent Ukrainian writer, Academy of Sciences of Ukraine, Lenin Prize and the State Prize of Ukraine. Hero of Socialist Labor
Volodymyr Horbulin, honorary member of the Presidium of the National Academy of Sciences of Ukraine, National Academy of Sciences of Ukraine, Doctor of Technical Sciences, Professor, Graduate DSU
Leonid Kuchma- President of Ukraine (1994-2005), Lenin Prize and the State Prize of Ukraine
Volodymyr Lytvyn, Chairman of the Verkhovna Rada of Ukraine (2002-2006), Academy of Sciences of Ukraine, laureate of the State Prize of Ukraine
Poet Lyubov Sirota
Petro Tronko, head. Institute of History of Ukraine, National Academy of Sciences of Ukraine, laureate of the State Prize of Ukraine
Yulia Tymoshenko, Former Prime Minister of Ukraine (2005, 2007-2010)
Horpyna Vatchenko, museum director and historian
Novelist Pavlo Zahrebelnyi
Mykhailo Zghurovskyi, Rector of the National Technical University of Ukraine ("KPI")

Awards and reputation
Dnipro National University took eighth place in the integrated ranking universities of Ukraine. According to Komsomolskaya Pravda, the most authoritative rankings that are referenced by experts and journalists, are national rankings UNESCO "Top-200 Ukraine", "Compass" and the international rating "Vebometryks."

International contacts
The faculty cooperates with Ukrainian and foreign higher educational establishments such as: 
 Kyiv National University, 
 Kharkiv State Design Academy, 
 Lublin University, Poland.

Students have periods of probation in higher educational establishments of:
 France (Lyceum of Moris Ravel, Nant city), 
 China, 
 Japan, 
 Sweden (Folk University), 
 USA (Minnesota University, Minneapolis city), Hungary (Budapest city, Hungary), 
 Richmond University (Virginia state, USA).

A General and Russian Linguistics Chair takes part in an international program of generation of new textbooks on Russian language and literature for CIS countries” in collaboration with the philological faculty of Saint-Petersburg State University; the chair also cooperates with the general linguistics chair of Sievierodvins’kyi branch of HOU VPO “Pomors’kyi State University, Russia.

A docent of the chair O.O. Polovynko taught the Russian language as a foreign one according to the agreement about cooperation between DNU and Shandun University in Veifan city (CNR) in 2007. A teacher of the Polish language M. Rutkovs’ka works at the chair by intergovernmental agreement between Ukraine and Poland. The chair is the center of the Russian language and literature teachers of Ukrainian association (Ukraine) (RLLTUA), which is the part of International association of the Russian language and literature teachers.

The chair trains foreign students and post-graduate students in the Russian language as a special one and the Russian language as the second foreign language, trains ethnic students from higher educational establishments in the specialty Language and Literature (Russian).

The translation and linguistic training of the foreigners chair cooperates with Gdansk University (Poland) and Sukhum University (Abkhazia).

The Russian philology chair has connections with higher educational establishments in France and Russia: with the University of Nant city, Moscow State University, and Belgorod state university.

Students study at universities abroad. Teachers and students study in CNR, Japan, and Turkey. The government of China sends professors of higher educational establishments of CNR every year according to the state agreement to teach the Chinese language and special philological disciples at the Chinese philology department.

See also 
 List of modern universities in Europe (1801–1945)

References

External links
 http://www.dnu.dp.ua/ -Official website (Ukrainian, Russian, English)

Educational institutions established in 1918
Universities and colleges in Dnipro
 
1918 establishments in Ukraine
National universities in Ukraine
Institutions with the title of National in Ukraine